Winning London is a 2001 direct-to-video comedy film directed by Craig Shapiro and starring Mary-Kate and Ashley Olsen.

Plot
Chloe Lawrence (Mary-Kate Olsen) is a very driven teenager and leader of her high school's Model United Nations team. After performing particularly well in a competition, Chloe's team is selected to attend the International Model United Nations in London, England. But when Randall, one of Chloe's team-mates, is unable to attend due to a family obligation, Chloe's twin sister, Riley (Ashley Olsen), steps in to take his place for the competition (and to get closer to Brian, another of Chloe's team-mates whom Riley happens to have a crush on).

When the group arrives in London, they discover that someone's already representing their usual country: China. Undaunted, they improvise and end up representing the United Kingdom. Plenty of sight-seeing and shopping ensues, during which Chloe falls for James Browning, the son of a wealthy British nobleman named Lord Browning, who's being pressured by his dad to achieve more. As the competition progresses, Chloe's over-competitive nature stalls her budding romance, Riley tries to get closer to Brian, and the team earns both admiration and anger for their unconventional methods. Nevertheless, tribulations are weathered and lessons learned about sportsmanship, overlooked friends, and learning to enjoy one's youth.

Cast 
 Mary-Kate Olsen as Chloe Lawrence
 Ashley Olsen as Riley Lawrence
 Brandon Tyler as Brian
 Jesse Spencer as James Browning
 Rachel Roth as Rachel
 Eric Jungmann as Dylan
 Claire Yarlett as Julia Watson
 Steven Shenbaum as Harry Holmes
 Paul Ridley as Lord Browning
 Stephanie Arellano as Gabriella
 Blythe Matsui as Sakura
 Curtis Anderson as Goofy delegate
 Garikayi Mutambirwa as Niko
 Jeremy Maxwell as Jonathan
 Benton Jennings as Chef
 Jerry Gelb as Bell Captain
 Robert Phelps as Head Judge
 Jarrett Lennon as Randall
 Richard Alan Brown as Kid
 Leo Dolan, Ken Flori as Cockney cabbies

References

External links
 
 

2001 films
2001 direct-to-video films
2000s English-language films
2000s children's comedy films
Films about high school debate
Films set in London
Warner Bros. direct-to-video films
Films about twin sisters
American children's comedy films
2001 comedy films
Twins in fiction
Films directed by Craig Shapiro
2000s American films